Commonwealth Broadcasting Network (CBN) is a Canadian English language discretionary specialty channel owned by Asian Television Network (ATN).

CBN primarily focuses on cricket programming such as live and tape-delayed matches featuring Commonwealth nations. CBN also broadcasts a select number of lifestyle, entertainment, and informational series aimed primarily at the Caribbean and African communities.

History
In November 2000, ATN, through one of its subsidiaries, was granted approval by the Canadian Radio-television and Telecommunications Commission (CRTC) to launch a television channel called Caribbean & African Network, described as "a national ethnic Category 2 pay television service targeting Caribbean and African communities."

The channel was launched on April 19, 2005 as ATN Caribbean on Rogers Cable, airing a variety of programming aimed at the Caribbean and African communities in Canada with such programming as sports, music, dramas, and more.

The channel later rebranded in the later 2000s as the Commonwealth Broadcasting Network (CBN) and began focusing more on cricket and other programming that would appeal to those outside the Caribbean and African communities, such as other Commonwealth nations.

On September 25, 2012, CBN's broadcasting licence to operate as a pay service was revoked at ATN's request. The channel subsequently re-launched as a regular specialty service on June 17, 2012, under the following license: ATN Cricket Channel One

References

External links 
 
 Weekly schedule

Digital cable television networks in Canada
Multicultural and ethnic television in Canada
Television channels and stations established in 2005
English-language television stations in Canada
Cricket on television